Caladesi Island State Park is a Florida State Park located on Caladesi Island in the Gulf of Mexico, across St. Joseph Sound to the west of Dunedin, Florida, and north of Clearwater Beach.

It is accessible by passenger ferry or by private boat from a dock on Honeymoon Island, provided primarily for convenience of access from the north (Dunedin area). Alternatively, since the late 1980s, the state park can be reached on foot from Clearwater Beach to the south; it is only separated by a "welcome" sign. Thus, Caladesi Island is not its own island, but shares its island geography with Clearwater Beach.

Amenities include a three-mile nature trail, a marina, picnic pavilions, bathhouses, a park concession stand, and a beach. In 2005, the Caladesi Island beach was listed as having the fourth-best beach in the country; in 2006 and 2007 the second-best; and in 2008 the best beach in the United States by Dr. Beach.

Originally part of a larger barrier island, Caladesi Island and Honeymoon Island were created in 1921 when a hurricane cut Hurricane Pass to divide the larger island into two parts. Although Caladesi is still referred to as a separate island, Hurricane Elena filled in Dunedin Pass in 1985, making Caladesi Island accessible by walking northward from North Clearwater Beach.

In the 1880s, homesteader Henry Scharrer and his daughter Myrtle lived on the island. Later in life, at the age of 87, Myrtle Scharrer Betz penned the book Yesteryear I Lived in Paradise, telling of her life on the barrier island.

Recreational activities
The park affords such activities as shelling; boating, including canoeing and kayaking; fishing; hiking; picnicking; swimming and snorkeling; and land-based nature studies, including birding and other wildlife-viewing.

Concessions are also available. The concession stand, Café Caladesi,  features "casual style beach fare". Its hours vary according to park hours.

Climate

Images

References

State parks of Florida
Tourist attractions in the Tampa Bay area
Parks in Pinellas County, Florida
Dunedin, Florida